"Heart/You" is the twelfth single by Japanese artist Masaharu Fukuyama. It was released on April 30, 1998. It was used as the drama Meguriai's theme song.

Track listing
 Heart
 You
 Like a Hurricane
 Heart (original karaoke)
 You (original karaoke)
 Like a Hurricane (original karaoke)

Oricon sales chart (Japan)

References

1998 singles
Masaharu Fukuyama songs
Japanese television drama theme songs
1998 songs
Songs written by Masaharu Fukuyama